Skagit County  is a county in the U.S. state of Washington. As of the 2020 census, the population was 129,523. The county seat and largest city is Mount Vernon. The county was formed in 1883 from Whatcom County and is named for  the Skagit Indian tribe, which has been indigenous to the area prior to European-American settlement.

Skagit County comprises the Mount Vernon-Anacortes, WA Metropolitan Statistical Area, and is included in the Seattle-Tacoma, WA Combined Statistical Area. It is located in the Puget Sound region.

Geography
It is noted for its broad, fertile valley of the Skagit River, a center for cultivation of tulips and strawberries.

Geographic features

Allan Island
Burrows Island
Cascade Mountains
Cypress Island
Fir Island
Fidalgo Island
Guemes Island
Hart Island
Hope Island
Kiket Island
Pass Island
Samish Island
Sauk River
Sinclair Island
Skagit Island
Skagit River
Vendovi Island
Mount Buckner, highest point in Skagit County

Adjacent counties
Whatcom County – north
Okanogan County – east
Chelan County – southeast
Snohomish County – south
Island County – southwest
San Juan County – west

National protected areas
 Mount Baker-Snoqualmie National Forest (part)
 North Cascades National Park (part)
 Ross Lake National Recreation Area (part)
 Pacific Northwest National Scenic Trail (part)

Demographics

2000 census
As of the census of 2000, there were 102,979 people, 38,852 households, and 27,351 families living in the county.  The population density was 59 people per square mile (23/km2).  There were 42,681 housing units at an average density of 25 per square mile (10/km2).  The racial makeup of the county was 86.49% White, 0.44% Black or African American, 1.85% Native American, 1.49% Asian, 0.16% Pacific Islander, 7.17% from other races, and 2.40% from two or more races.  11.20% of the population were Hispanic or Latino of any race. 13.9% were of German, 11.2% English, 9.2% Norwegian, 8.2% Irish and 6.7% United States or American ancestry.

Three Salish Native American tribes have reservations in the county: the Swinomish, Upper Skagit, and Samish.

There were 38,852 households, out of which 32.80% had children under the age of 18 living with them, 56.60% were married couples living together, 9.70% had a female householder with no husband present, and 29.60% were non-families. 23.30% of all households were made up of individuals, and 10.00% had someone living alone who was 65 years of age or older.  The average household size was 2.60 and the average family size was 3.06.

In the county, the population was spread out, with 26.30% under the age of 18, 8.60% from 18 to 24, 26.90% from 25 to 44, 23.60% from 45 to 64, and 14.60% who were 65 years of age or older.  The median age was 37 years. For every 100 females there were 98.00 males.  For every 100 females age 18 and over, there were 95.70 males.

The median income for a household in the county was $42,381, and the median income for a family was $48,347. Males had a median income of $37,207 versus $26,123 for females. The per capita income for the county was $21,256.  About 7.90% of families and 11.10% of the population were below the poverty line, including 13.50% of those under age 18 and 6.80% of those age 65 or over.

2010 census
As of the 2010 census, there were 116,901 people, 45,557 households, and 30,656 families living in the county. The racial makeup of the county was 83.4% white, 2.2% American Indian, 1.8% Asian, 0.7% black or African American, 0.2% Pacific islander, 8.7% from other races, and 3.2% from two or more races. Those of Hispanic or Latino origin made up 16.9% of the population. The largest ancestry groups were: 17.8% German, 14.9% Mexican, 13.7% English, 11.4% Irish, 8.3% Norwegian, 4.8% Swedish, and 4.3% Dutch.

Of the 45,557 households, 30.8% had children under the age of 18 living with them, 52.1% were married couples living together, 10.1% had a female householder with no husband present, 32.7% were non-families, and 25.6% of all households were made up of individuals. The average household size was 2.53 and the average family size was 3.01. The median age was 40.1 years.

The median income for a household in the county was $54,811 and the median income for a family was $63,468. Males had a median income of $48,979 versus $34,628 for females. The per capita income for the county was $26,925. About 7.4% of families and 11.7% of the population were below the poverty line, including 16.0% of those under age 18 and 6.2% of those age 65 or over.

Government
Skagit County's government is headed by three commissioners, in the system laid out in the state constitution for all counties without charters. Commissioners are "nominated" in the primary by their district, but then are elected in the general by a county-wide vote. Commissioners are therefore said to represent the entire county, and not just their district.

The current Skagit County commissioners include Lisa Janicki, a Democrat from District 3, which encompasses Burlington east of Interstate 5, Sedro-Woolley, and the rest of eastern Skagit County; Peter Browning, an independent from District 2, which covers Mount Vernon, Conway, and south county; and Ron Wesen, a Republican from District 1, which includes Anacortes, La Conner, and that area of the county west of Interstate 5 and north of McLean Road.

Politics
Skagit County had been a bellwether county since the election of Ronald Reagan in 1980, voting for the winning candidate in each subsequent presidential election until it was carried by Democrat Hillary Clinton in 2016 (though only by a plurality).

County conservation efforts
In 2006, the Skagit County Marine Resources Committee commissioned a study to evaluate establishing one or more no-take marine reserves to protect rockfish and other groundfish from overfishing.

Transportation
Skagit Transit provides the county with bus service.  It also offers connections to Everett, Bellingham, Whidbey Island and Camano Island, and operates the Guemes Island ferry linking Anacortes to Guemes Island.

Major highways
 Interstate 5
 State Route 9
 State Route 20

Communities

Cities
Anacortes
Burlington
Mount Vernon (county seat)
Sedro-Woolley

Towns
Concrete
Hamilton
La Conner
Lyman

Census-designated places

Alger
Bay View
Big Lake
Clear Lake
Conway
Edison
Lake Cavanaugh
Lake McMurray
Marblemount
Rockport

Unincorporated communities

Allen
Avon
Birdsview
Bow
Blanchard
Cedardale
Day Creek
Dewey
Fidalgo
Fishtown
Gibraltar
Guemes Island
Hoogdal
Milltown
Prairie
Rexville
Samish Island
Similk Beach
Sterling
Thornwood
Urban
Van Horn
Whitney

Reservations
Swinomish Indian Reservation
Upper Skagit Indian Reservation
Samish Indian Reservation

Ghost Towns
Ehrlich
Skagit City
Whitney

Film 
The 2021 experimental horror film Skagit, written and directed by Nick Thompson, is set and shot entirely in Skagit County.

See also
 National Register of Historic Places listings in Skagit County, Washington
 Equality Colony

Footnotes

Further reading
 An Illustrated History of Skagit and Snohomish Counties, Washington, Their People, Their Commerce and Their Resources: With an Outline of the Early History of the State of Washington. Chicago: Interstate Publishing Co., 1906.

External links

Official Skagit County website
Independent Skagit County Website

 
1883 establishments in Washington Territory
Populated places established in 1883
North Cascades of Washington (state)
Western Washington
Washington placenames of Native American origin